Luz Stella Luengas (born 13 February 1962) is a Colombian actress. She is best known for her performance as Ana María Franco in Padres e Hijos.

Filmography 
"La ley del corazón" (2016)
"Quien mato a Patricia Soler?" (2015) ...
"El Clon" (2010) TV series .... Zoraida
"Gabriela giros del destino" (2009) .... Olga de Rueda
"La Traición" (2008)  .... Esther de Obregon (unknown episodes)
Karmma, el peso de tus actos (2006) .... Noemí de Valbuena
Visitas (2006) .... Alicia
"Te Voy A Enseñar A Querer" .... Clementina Divas
Te busco (2002)
"La Venganza" (2002) .... Yolanda Díaz
 Bogotá 2016 (2001) .... Mamá (segment "Zapping")
 "Luzbel esta de visita" (2001)  .... Paulina Estrada
 "Entre amores" (2000)
 Kalibre 35 (2000) .... Bank Manager
 "La reina de Queens" (2000)
 "Yo amo a Paquita Gallego"  (1998) .... Tatiana Martin
Padres e Hijos (1992–1998) .... Ana María Franco

References

External links

Colombian telenovela actresses
Colombian television actresses
Living people
1962 births